Mr. India is a 1961 film about a naive unemployed youth who is mistaken for a look-alike gangster. I.S. Johar stars as Gullu, and Geeta Bali portrays Miss Bembi.

Plot
Gulu Lala lives a middle-classed lifestyle along with his parents in Chinchpokli, Bombay. Believing himself to be Hindustani and speaking Hindi, he is unable to secure employment with Parsi, Sindhi, Marwari, and Tamil businessmen, and spends his time walking a stray dog, Charlie, along Marine Drive. One day, he comes to the rescue of Sindhi-speaking wealthy businessman, Rai Bahadur Himmatchand and his snobbish daughter, Bembi, who initially "borrow" Charlie and then Gullu himself to live in their mansion. Eventually, the couple get attracted to each other - little knowing that soon their respective lives will be changed drastically when Gullu will be mistaken for a look-alike gangster named Jung Bahadur, while a disapproving Himmatchand is all set to get his daughter married to a wealthy man named Kamal Jeet.This is G.P Sippy last film as a Director.

Cast
Geeta Bali as Bembi
I. S. Johar as Gullu Lala / Jung Bahadur
Helen as Rita Sahu
 Hari Shivdasani as Rai Bahadur Himmatchand

Soundtrack
The music was scored by  G.S.Kohli . Lyrics were written by Jan Nisar Akhtar and Anjaan (lyricist)

References

External links

1961 films
1960s Hindi-language films
Films scored by G. S. Kohli